Bernhard Gustav Rösing, (29 October 1869, New York City – 10 January 1947, Kiel) was a Vizeadmiral (vice admiral)  of the Kaiserliche Marine during the World War I. Rösing commanded  from November 1911 to December 1912 and  from November 1916 to November 1918.

Career
Rösing was born on 29 October 1869 in New York. He was the third of eight children of the lawyer and diplomat Dr Johannes Rösing (1833-1907) and his wife Clara, née von Ammon (1843-1931. After receiving his Abitur in Berlin, he joined the Kaiserliche Marine (Imperial Navy) in 1888. Following his attendance of the Naval Academy in Kiel he progressed in rank from midshipmen, to the lieutenant ranks, to captain, and admiral. From 1908, he worked in the Naval Office (Reichsmarineamt) in Berlin. The marriage with the architect's daughter and the Naval officer Rudolf von Eickstedt's stepdaughter Elfriede Wünsche (1882–1961) produced one daughter (Elfriede) and four sons (Haro, Bernhard, Kurt-Wolf, Friedrich Wilhelm), three of which were killed in action in World War II. After the war, he was commissioned to dissolve the imperial shipyard in Danzig.

References
Citations

Bibliography

External links

1869 births
1947 deaths
Military personnel from New York City
Vice admirals of the Imperial German Navy
Imperial German Navy admirals of World War I